Expedition 5 was the fifth long-duration stay on the International Space Station (ISS). The crew, consisting of three people, remained in space for 184 days, 178 of which were spent aboard the ISS. Expedition 5 was a continuation of an uninterrupted human presence in space, as of November 2022, which was begun by Expedition 1 in 2000-2001.

The crew of Expedition 5 launched to space aboard the Space Shuttle Endeavour aboard the STS-111 mission on 5 June 2002. Their tenure aboard the station, however, did not begin until they docked with the ISS two days later on 7 June.

Crew

Mission parameters 
Perigee: 384 km
Apogee: 396 km
Inclination: 51.6°
Period: 92 min

Mission objectives 
The Expedition Five crew took charge of ISS operations on 7 June 2002. An official ceremony between Expedition crews took place 10 June, with the ceremonial ringing of the station's brass bell, symbolizing the transfer of command. The Expedition Five crew carried out approximately 25 new investigations on board the ISS, as well as continued with various science investigations begun before their stay. The crew wrapped up a 184-day stay in space when they returned home on STS-113 7 December 2002.

Space Shuttle Endeavour delivered the Expedition 5 crew during mission STS-111 which launched 5 June 2002. The fifth crew to live aboard the International Space Station was led by Russian Valery Korzun and joined by fellow Cosmonaut Sergei Treshchev and U.S. Astronaut Peggy A. Whitson, both flight engineers. While on board, Dr. Whitson was named NASA's first ISS Science Officer by NASA Administrator O'Keefe.

Spacewalks 
The Expedition Five crewmembers conducted two spacewalks during their stay at the International Space Station. Both were based out of the Pirs Docking Compartment and used Russian Orlan space suits.

References

NASA

External links

 Expedition 5 Photography
 ISS Expedition Five Crew (with mission overview)

Expedition 05
2002 in spaceflight